Denis Gankin (born 13 December 1989 in Taldykorgan, Kazakh SSR, Soviet Union) is a Kazakhstani archer. He competed at the 2012 Summer Olympics in London, where he reached the second round.

He is the brother of Artyom Gankin.

References

External links
 

Kazakhstani male archers
1989 births
Living people
Archers at the 2012 Summer Olympics
Olympic archers of Kazakhstan
Kazakhstani people of Russian descent
Archers at the 2014 Asian Games
Archers at the 2018 Asian Games
People from Taldykorgan
Asian Games competitors for Kazakhstan
Archers at the 2020 Summer Olympics